Buur Ukur (also written Buur Cukur, Bur Ukur, Burukur, Buurukur) is the name of both a town and the surrounding low-lying region in Ethiopia's Gode Zone in the Somali Region.

Overview
It is located on the eastern shore of the Shabelle River, close to the region's main town, Mustahīl (Mustaxiil), and the Somali border town of Ferfer.

References

Somali Region